Harrison Manzala Tusumgama (born 6 March 1994) is a professional footballer who plays as a midfielder for Liga I club Petrolul Ploiești. Born in France, he represented DR Congo at youth international level.

Club career
Born in Aubervilliers, Manzala is a youth product of Le Havre. He made his Ligue 2 debut on 3 May 2013 against Istres in a 2–0 home win. A week later, he scored his first goal for the club, against Le Mans in a 4–0 away win, and went on to make 49 league appearances before signing for Amiens in 2016, where he helped his new club gain promotion from Ligue 2 and made 37 appearances in the 2017–18 Ligue 1 season.

Manzala moved on to another Ligue 1 club, Angers, but made only a few substitute appearances before, in February 2019, he joined Maccabi Petah Tikva on loan to the end of the season. He moved to Le Mans, newly promoted to Ligue 2, on loan for the 2019–20 season. On 18 December 2019, he scored Le Mans's sole goal in a 4–1 defeat to Paris Saint-Germain in the Coupe de la Ligue round of 16.

On 13 January 2022, Manzala signed a contract with Ligue 2 club Bastia which ran until the end of the season. On 25 August 2022, he signed a two-year contract with Romanian club Petrolul Ploiești, newly promoted to the Liga I.

References

External links

1994 births
Living people
French sportspeople of Democratic Republic of the Congo descent
Sportspeople from Aubervilliers
Democratic Republic of the Congo footballers
Democratic Republic of the Congo under-20 international footballers
French footballers
Association football midfielders
Ligue 1 players
Ligue 2 players
Championnat National 2 players
Championnat National 3 players
Le Havre AC players
Amiens SC players
Angers SCO players
Israeli Premier League players
Maccabi Petah Tikva F.C. players
Le Mans FC players
Süper Lig players
Kayserispor footballers
SC Bastia players
Liga I players
FC Petrolul Ploiești players
French expatriate footballers
French expatriate sportspeople in Israel
Expatriate footballers in Israel
French expatriate sportspeople in Turkey
Expatriate footballers in Turkey
French expatriate sportspeople in Romania
Expatriate footballers in Romania
Footballers from Seine-Saint-Denis
Black French sportspeople